Spence McTavish (born 25 August 1948) is a Canadian rugby union player. He played in 22 matches for the Canada national rugby union team from 1970 to 1987, including two matches at the 1987 Rugby World Cup.

References

1948 births
Living people
Canadian rugby union players
Canada international rugby union players
Place of birth missing (living people)